Sight Life, previously known as Cardiff Institute for the Blind (CIB), is Cardiff's oldest charity, founded in 1865 and offering support to visually impaired residents of Cardiff and the Vale of Glamorgan.

History of CIB 
Cardiff Institute for the Blind was founded in April 1865 by Frances Batty Shand, the daughter of a Jamaican plantation owner.

After moving to Cardiff, Shand set up a small workshop employing five blind men to make baskets for coal ships. After employing ten more men, the workshop was relocated to Byron Street in Roath, later moving to Longcross Road - near the institute's former home on Newport Road.

By 1900, around 100 blind men and women were employed making baskets, brushes and mats.

The Longcross Street building was destroyed during World War II. A plot of land situated on Newport Road was donated to the charity in 1949 - and made way for Shand House completed and opened in 1953.

The Institute celebrated their 140th birthday in 2005 with a march through Queen Street, followed by a party. By this date the CIB was helping 7,500 people with visual impairments, funded by £350,000 raised by the charity.

The Institute remained at Shand House until October 2012, when they moved to a temporary accommodation in Bridge Street until their new headquarters in Womanby Street, Cardiff, was completed. They share the new offices with the Royal National Institute for the Blind (RNIB).

Services 
CIB offers support and services for visually impaired people in Cardiff and the Vale of Glamorgan.

Music Club
CIB has recently launched a Music Club which is open to all.

Computer Club
The institute's Computer Club has been running for over 10 years, providing around 30,000 training sessions for visually impaired people.

Campaigning 
Working alongside RNIB, CIB is campaigning to gain equality for the visually impaired in receiving Disability Allowance.

References

Organisations based in Cardiff
Blindness organisations in the United Kingdom
Medical and health organisations based in Wales
1865 establishments in Wales
Organizations established in 1865